Lillord Creek is a creek in the Unorganized West Part of Timiskaming District in northeastern Ontario, Canada. It is in the Saint Lawrence River drainage basin and is a right tributary of the Blanche River.

Course
The creek rises at Lillord Lake in geographic Lee Township, It flows southeast to Berube Lake then through two unnamed lakes. The Blanche River flows via Lake Timiskaming and the Ottawa River to the Saint Lawrence River.

References

Other map sources:

Rivers of Timiskaming District